The Motorola 68000 Educational Computer Board (MEX68KECB) was a development board for the Motorola 68000 microprocessor, introduced by Motorola in 1981. It featured the 68K CPU, memory, I/O devices and built-in educational and training software.

Hardware

 CPU: 4-MHz Motorola 68000
 RAM: 32KB
 ROM: 16KB
 9600 baud serial port for dumb terminal connection
 9600 baud serial port for host computer connection
 Parallel port for communication and printer connection
 Audio output for tape storage
 24-bit programmable interval timer
 Wire-wrap area for custom circuitry
 Required power voltages: -12V, +5V and +12V

Software
The board has built-in 16K ROM memory containing assembly/disassembly/stepping/monitoring software called TUTOR. The software was operated using command-line interface over a serial link, and provided many commands useful in machine code debugging. Memory contents (including programs) could be dumped via a serial link to a file on the host computer. The file was transferred in Motorola's S-Record format. Similarly, files from host could be uploaded to the board's arbitrary user memory area.

Price

Use
According to the manual, for basic use only a dumb terminal and power source are required. However, it seems that in colleges the board was predominantly used in connection with a time-sharing host computer to teach assembly language programming and other computer science subjects.

References

MC68000 Educational Computer Board User's Manual

External links
 MC68000 Educational Computer Board User's Manual 

Early microcomputers
Microcomputers
Single-board computers